"Frau Holle" (also known as "Mother Holle", "Mother Hulda" or "Old Mother Frost") is a German fairy tale collected by the Brothers Grimm in Children's and Household Tales in 1812 (KHM 24). It is of Aarne-Thompson type 480.

Frau Holle (also known in various regions as Holla, Holda, Perchta, Berchta, Berta, or Bertha) was initially a pre-Christian female legendary figure who survived in popular belief well into the 19th century.

The name may be cognate of the Scandinavian creature known as the Hulder. Jacob Grimm made an attempt to establish her as a Germanic goddess.

The legendary creature

Etymology 

The name is thought to originate from German huld ("gracious, friendly, sympathetic, grateful" found in hold sein, huldigen), Middle High German hulde, Old High German huldī ("friendliness"). Cognate with Danish and Swedish huld ("fair, kindly, gracious") or 'hyld' ("secret, hidden"), Icelandic hollur ("faithful, dedicated, loyal"), Middle English hold, holde, Old English hold ("gracious, friendly, kind, favorable, true, faithful, loyal, devout, acceptable, pleasant"), from Proto-Germanic hulþaz ("favourable, gracious, loyal"), from Proto-Indo-European *kel- ("to tend, incline, bend, tip").

The name Hludana is found in five Latin inscriptions: three from the lower Rhine (Corpus Inscriptionum Latinarum XIII 8611, 8723, 8661), one from Münstereifel and one from Beetgum, Frisia all dating from 197 AD-235 AD. Many attempts have been made to interpret this name.

Origins and attestations 

Marija Gimbutas names Hulda (or Holda, Holla, Holle) as having originally been an ancient Germanic supreme goddess who predates most of the Germanic pantheon, including deities such as Odin, Thor, Freya, and Loki, continuing traditions of pre-Indo-European Neolithic Europe.

As Christianity slowly replaced Germanic paganism during the Early Middle Ages, many of the old customs were gradually lost or assimilated into Christian tradition. By the end of the High Middle Ages, Germanic paganism was almost completely marginalized and blended into rural folklore, in which the character of Frau Hulda eventually survived.

In Germanic pre-Christian folklore, Hulda, Holda, Holle, and Holla were all names to denote a single being. Hulda is also related to the Germanic figure of Perchta. She dwells at the bottom of a well, rides a wagon, and first taught the craft of making linen from flax. According to Erika Timm, Perchta emerged from an amalgamation of Germanic and pre-Germanic, probably Celtic, traditions of the Alpine regions after the Migration Period in the Early Middle Ages. 

Holle is the goddess to whom children who died as infants go, and alternatively known as both the Dunkle Großmutter (Dark Grandmother) and the Weisse Frau (White Lady), elements which are more typically associated with the Grimms' fairy tale as well. 

Frau Holle's festival is in the middle of winter, the time when humans retreat indoors from the cold. It may be of significance that the Twelve Days of Christmas were originally the Zwölften ("the Twelve"), which like the same period in the Celtic calendar were an intercalary period during which the dead were thought to roam abroad.

Holda's connection to the spirit world through the magic of spinning and weaving has associated her with witchcraft in Catholic German folklore. She was considered to ride with witches on distaffs, which closely resemble the brooms that witches are thought to ride. Likewise, Holda was often identified with Diana in old church documents. As early as the beginning of the 11th century she appears to have been known as the leader of women, and of female nocturnal spirits, which "in common parlance are called Hulden from Holda". These women would leave their houses in spirit, going "out through closed doors in the silence of the night, leaving their sleeping husbands behind". They would travel vast distances through the sky, to great feasts, or to battles amongst the clouds.

The 9th century Canon Episcopi censures women who claim to have ridden with a "crowd of demons". Burchard's later recension of the same text expands on this in a section titled "De arte magica":

Have you believed there is some female, whom the stupid vulgar call Holda [in some manuscripts strigam Holdam, the witch Holda], who is able to do a certain thing, such that those deceived by the devil affirm themselves by necessity and by command to be required to do, that is, with a crowd of demons transformed into the likeness of women, on fixed nights to be required to ride upon certain beasts, and to themselves be numbered in their company? If you have performed participation in this unbelief, you are required to do penance for one year on designated fast-days.

Later canonical and church documents make her synonymous with Diana, Herodias, Bertha, Richella, and Abundia. Ginzburg (1990) has identified similar beliefs existing throughout Europe for over 1,000 years, whereby men and women were thought to leave their bodies in spirit and follow a goddess variously called Holda, Diana, Herodias, Signora Oriente, Richella, Arada, and Perchta. He also identifies strong morphological similarities with the earlier goddesses Hecate / Artemis, Artio, the Matres of Engyon, the Matronae, and Epona, as well as figures from fairy-tales, such as Cinderella.

A 16th century fable recorded by Erasmus Alberus speaks of "an army of women" with sickles in hand sent by Frau Hulda. Thomas Reinesius in the 17th century speaks of Werra of the Voigtland and her "crowd of maenads."

Frau Holle figures in some pre-Christian Alpine traditions that have survived to modern times. During the Christmas period in the alpine regions of Germany, Austria and northern Switzerland, wild masked processions are still held in a number of towns, impersonating Holda, Perchta, or related beings, and the wild hunt. Vivid visual descriptions of her may allude to a popular costumed portrayal, perhaps as part of a seasonal festival or holiday drama.

Here cometh up Dame Hulde with the snout, to wit, nature, and goeth about to gainstay her God and give him the lie, hangeth her old ragfair about her, the straw-harness; then falls to work and scrapes it featly on her fiddle. — M. Luther (1522)

Grimm based his theory of Holda on what he took to be the earliest references to her: An 11th century interpolation to the Canon Episcopi by Burchard of Worms, and pre-Christian Roman inscriptions to Hludana that he tentatively linked to the same divinity. There were early challenges to connecting this figure with a pagan goddess, since her earliest definite appearance links her with the Virgin Mary, commonly called the "Queen of Heaven": An early-13th century text listing superstitions states that "In the night of Christ's Nativity they set the table for the Queen of Heaven, whom the people call Frau Holda, that she might help them". Lotte Motz and Ginzburg both conclude that she is pre-Christian in origin, based on comparison with other remarkably similar figures and ritual observances spread throughout Europe.

A pagan Holda received wide distribution in catalogs of superstitions and in sermons during the 15th century, and in the 16th, Martin Luther employed the image to personify the shortcomings of hostile Reason in theological contexts.

Variants

Frau Gauden 

Frau Gauden, also known as Frau Gode, Frau Gaur, Fru Goden, Frau Wohl, and Mutter Gauerken, is a being from the folklore of Mecklenburg. She is said to be cursed because she expressed to prefer eternally hunt rather than go to Heaven, and her daughters, who expressed the same desire, were transformed into small dogs who either pull her wagon or sled, or serve as hunting dogs. She visits the homes of humans during the Twelve Nights of Christmas and punishes the lazy while sometimes rewarding the virtuous or those who help her.

Perchta 

The Grimms say Perchta or Berchta was known "precisely in those Upper German regions where Holda leaves off, in Swabia, in Alsace, in Switzerland, in Bavaria and Austria."
According to Jacob Grimm (1882), Perchta was spoken of in Old High German in the 10th century as Frau Berchta and thought to be a white-robed female spirit. She was known as a goddess who oversaw spinning and weaving, like myths of Holda in Continental German regions. He believes she was the feminine equivalent of Berchtold, and she was sometimes the leader of the wild hunt.

According to Erika Timm, Perchta emerged from an amalgamation of Germanic and pre-Germanic, probably Celtic, traditions of the Alpine regions after the Migration Period in the Early Middle Ages.

Spillaholle 

The Spillaholle (Silesian German also Spillahulle, Spillahole, Spillahôle, Spiellahole; Standard German: Spindelholle; English translation: "spindle Holle") is a legendary creature exclusively found in German folklore of formerly German Silesia including Austrian Silesia. A similar being is found in folktales of formerly German-speaking Bohemia. The Spillaholle is a Silesian variant of female German legendary creatures such as Hulda (Frau Holle) or Perchta. In Bohemia, she is simply known as Frau Holle ("Mrs. Holle"). Other Silesian names are Satzemsuse, Mickadrulle, and Mickatrulle.

The Spindelholle is a sallow old woman with short arms and legs, sometimes directly called a hag. She appears hooded (characterized by the name Popelhole or Popelhôle; Standard German: Popelholle; English translation: "hooded Holle") or wearing ragged clothing (as shown by the name variant Zumpeldrulle or Zompeldroll). She also can be seen in old Franconian dress or generally shaped as a pelt sleeve. The Bohemian Frau Holle is a small and ugly old woman which carries a batch of stinging nettles.

The main activity of the Spillaholle is connected with spinning, for she is the overseer of spinning taboos and a bogey used for spinning children. Therefore, a broad variety of names for the Spillaholle shows connection to spindles, such as Spilladrulle, Spillagritte, Spillmarthe, Spillalutsche or Spellalutsche.

The appearance of the Spillaholle is mainly during the winter months, especially during Advent, Christmas or during the Zwölften (twelve nights of Christmas). She goes from house to house to see if the children and spinsters are spinning diligently, looking through the windows or even all gaps in the house wall. When they are still spinning during evening and night, then there will be slight or even severe punishments.

When spinsters are not finished with their spinning, then the Satzemsuse will sit in their lap during spinning or even give them igneous spindles instead of normal ones. The Spillaholle takes the lazy spinsters away. Frau Holle beats them with a batch of stinging nettles. If all the tow is already spun, then there will not only be no punishment, even one of the nettles will be left in the house to ward the house of misfortune for the whole coming year. Additionally, in Bohemia all spinning is banned on the night of St. Thomas. If a spinster is working anyway, she will be punished by Frau Holle.

To children spinning in the night the Spindelholle says: "Verzage nicht, verzage nicht, warum spinnst du die Zahl am Tage nicht?" (Do not quail, do not quail, why do you not spin the number at day?) Then she kills the children or takes them away. That this will not happen the children will be warned by their parents when at evening the wind is howling in the stove: "Die Spillagritte kommt!" (The Spillagritte comes!), or they will have to listen to the following rhyme:

The Spillaholle also scares people to death or walks abroad at forest tracks. A less malicious activity of her is the causation of snow, just like it is known from the standard Frau Holle as well. When the Spillaholle shakes her bed, then it will snow.

The Spindelholle's home lies beneath a rock in the woods, known as the Spillalutschenstein ("Spillalutsche's stone"). At night, seven lights can be seen above the Spillalutschenstein. Normally, the Spillaholle appears solitarily, but as Popelhole, she is wed to the Popelmann, a German Silesian Bogeyman. As Satzemsuse she has companions which are the Satzemkater (Kater = tomcat), the Satzemziege (Ziege = goat) and the Rilpen, a collectivity of wood sprites. The Bohemian Frau Holle is accompanied by small deformed wights which she orders to beat outrageous spinsters with rods.

The fairy tale

Background 

The tale was published by the Brothers Grimm in the first edition of Kinder- und Hausmärchen, published in 1812. Their source was Wilhelm Grimm's friend and future wife Dortchen Wild. Some details were added in the second edition (1819), most notably rooster's greetings, based upon the account of Georg August Friedrich Goldmann from Hanover.

It is still a common expression in Hesse, Southern parts of the Netherlands and beyond to say "Hulda is making her bed" when it is snowing, that is, she shakes her bed and out comes snow from heaven. Like many other tales collected by the Brothers Grimm, the story of Frau Holle was told to teach a moral. In this case, it is that hard work is rewarded and laziness is punished.

Synopsis 

A rich widow lived with her daughter and her stepdaughter. The widow favored her younger biological daughter, allowing her to become spoiled and idle while her older stepdaughter was left to do all the work. Every day, the stepdaughter would sit outside the cottage and spin beside the well.

One day, she pricked her finger on the point of the spindle. As she leaned over the well to wash the blood away, the spindle fell from her hand and sank out of sight. The stepdaughter feared that she would be punished for losing the spindle, and in panic she leapt into the well after it.

The girl found herself in a meadow, where she came upon an oven full of bread. The bread asked to be taken out before it burned. With a baker's peel, she took all the loaves out and then walked on. Then she came to an apple tree that asked that its apples be harvested. So she did so and gathered them into a pile before continuing on her way. Finally, she came to a small house of an old woman, who offered to allow the girl to stay if she would help with the housework.

The woman identified herself as Frau Holle, and cautioned the girl to shake the featherbed pillows and coverlet well when she made the bed, as that would make it snow in the girl's world. The girl agreed to take service with Frau Holle, and took care to always shake the featherbed until the feathers flew about like snowflakes.

After a time, the girl became homesick and told Frau Holle that it was time for her to return home. Frau Holle had been impressed by the girl's kindness and hard work so much that, when she escorted the girl to the gate, a shower of gold fell upon the girl. She also gave her the spindle which had fallen into the well. With that, the gate was closed and the girl found herself back not far from her mother's house.

Her mother wished the same good fortune for her biological daughter. She also set her to sit by the well and spin, but the girl deliberately threw the spindle into the well before jumping in herself. She too came to the oven, but would not assist the bread nor would she help the apple tree. When she came to Frau Holle's house, she likewise took service there. She then fell into her lazy careless ways. Frau Holle soon dismissed her. As the lazy girl stood at the gate, a kettle of pitch spilled over her. "That is what you have earned" said Frau Holle and closed the gate.

Other versions describe the first girl having a piece of gold fall from her lips every time she speaks, whilst the second has a toad fall from her lips every time she speaks as depicted in Diamonds and Toads.

Analysis 

Like many of the other tales collected by the Grimm brothers, "Frau Holle" personifies good behavior and bad, and the appropriate reward meted out for each. Even so, it also exhibits a number of contrasts with other stories. Typically, the magical beings who appear in the tales must enter the real world and appear to the protagonists before any intercession can take place. Moreover, these beings are almost always anonymous and therefore difficult to correlate with figures in pre-Christian mythology. By contrast, Frau Holle resides somewhere above the Earth, and the protagonists must go to her, paradoxically by diving into a spring. When she makes her bed, loose feathers are 'stirred up' and fall to earth as snow, and so this fairy tale is an origin myth as well. Comparison between Frau Holle and a weather or earth goddess is inevitable. Jakob Grimm notes that Thunar (Thor) makes rain in a similar fashion, implying for Frau Holle a very high rank in the pantheon.

Though not unique in this respect, the Frau Holle story is also notable for the absence of class-related motifs such as palaces, halls to which one may or may not be invited, and the rise to the status of the nobility through marriage.

According to the Aarne and Thompson classification system of fairy tales, Mother Hulda is a story of type 480, The Kind and the Unkind Girls. Others of this type include Shita-kiri Suzume, Diamonds and Toads, The Three Heads in the Well, Father Frost, The Three Little Men in the Wood, The Enchanted Wreath, The Old Witch, and The Two Caskets. Literary variants include The Three Fairies and Aurore and Aimée.

Film adaptations 

 Mother Holly (1906), Germany
 Frau Holle (1953), East Germany
 Mother Holly (1954), West Germany
 Mother Holly (1961), West Germany
 Mother Holly (1963), East Germany
 Once Upon a Time (1973), West Germany
 The Feather Fairy (1985), Czechoslovakia
 Frau Holle (2008), Germany

See also 

 Grandmother Winter, a children's story based on Frau Holle
 Kallo and the Goblins
 The Months
 The Three Spinners, a similar fairy tale, also collected by the Brothers Grimm.
 True and Untrue
 Diamonds and Toads
 Father Frost (fairy tale)

References

Literature 

 Grimm, Jacob (1835). Deutsche Mythologie (German Mythology); From English released version Grimm's Teutonic Mythology (1888); Available online by Northvegr 2004-2007. Chapter 13:4 Holda, Holle. Dead link
 Marzell: Spillaholle. In: Hanns Bächtold-Stäubli, Eduard Hoffmann-Krayer: Handwörterbuch des Deutschen Aberglaubens: Band 8 Silber-Vulkan. Berlin 1937. (reprint: Walter de Gruyter, Berlin/New York 2000)
 Will-Erich Peuckert: Schlesische Sagen. Munich 1924. (reprint: Eugen Diederichs Verlag, Munich 1993)
 Richard Kühnau: Sagen aus Schlesien. Berlin 1914. (reprint: Salzwasser Verlag, Paderborn 2011)
 Josef Virgil Grohmann: Sagen-Buch von Böhmen und Mähren. Prague 1863. (reprint: Holzinger, Berlin 2013)
 Richard Beitl: Untersuchungen zur Mythologie des Kindes: herausgegeben von Bernd Rieken und Michael Simon. Partially approved: Berlin, University, habilitation treatise R. Beitl, 1933, Waxmann Verlag, Münster/New York/Munich/Berlin 2007, .

Further reading 
 Leek, Thonas. "Holda: Between folklore and linguistics". In: Indogermanische Forschungen 113, no. 2008 (2008): 312-338. https://doi.org/10.1515/9783110206630.312

External links 
 
 
 
 Comprehensive list of Grimm Fairy Tales
 Illustrations of Mother Holle by Otto Kubel

German legendary creatures
Female legendary creatures
1812 short stories
Female characters in fairy tales
Flax
German fairy tales
Grimms' Fairy Tales
Fiction about magic
Textiles in folklore
Witchcraft in folklore and mythology
Germanic goddesses
ATU 460-499